The Chinese Ambassador to Vietnam is the official representative of the People's Republic of China to the Socialist Republic of Vietnam.

List of representatives

South Vietnam

The Chinese Ambassador to South Vietnam was the official representative of the People's Republic of China to the Republic of Vietnam.

List of representatives (South Vietnam)

See also
China–Vietnam relations
Taiwan–Vietnam relations
Taipei Economic and Cultural Office, Ho Chi Minh City

References 

 
Vietnam
China